Dorsum (plural Dorsa) is a Latin word. In science, it may refer to:

Anatomy 
 Dorsum (anatomy), the upper side of an animal, or the back in erect organisms
Dorsum humanum, the human back
 Dorsum of foot, the top of the foot
 Dorsum of hand, the back of the hand
 The back of the tongue, which is used for articulating dorsal consonants

Other uses 
 Dorsum (moth), genus of moths of the family Erebidae
 Dorsum (astrogeology), wrinkle ridges found on planets or moons
 Theta Capricorni, a star on the back of Capricornus